The 1942 Cotton Bowl Classic, part of the 1941 bowl game season, took place on January 1, 1942, at the Cotton Bowl in Dallas, Texas. The competing teams were the Alabama Crimson Tide, representing the Southeastern Conference (SEC), and the Texas A&M Aggies, representing the Southwest Conference (SWC) as conference champions. Alabama won the game 29–21.

Teams

Alabama

The 1941 Alabama squad finished the regular season with an 8–2 record. The Crimson Tide also finished third in SEC play with losses to Vanderbilt and conference champion Mississippi State. Following their victory over Miami, Alabama accepted an invitation to play in the Cotton Bowl on New Years Day on December 1. The appearance marked the first for Alabama in the Cotton Bowl, and the first bowl game played outside the Rose Bowl Game.

Texas A&M

Texas A&M finished the regular season with a 9–1 with its lone defeat coming against Texas. The appearance marked the second for the Aggies in the Cotton Bowl, as they defeated Fordham 13–12 in the 1941 game.

Game summary
In a game statistically tilted toward the Aggies, Alabama won 29–21, after racing to a 29–7 lead.  Alabama then inserted its third-string, allowing for Texas A&M's late scoring. Alabama had only one first down to A&M's 13; however, under the Southwest Conference rules in 1942, touchdown runs and pass plays were not counted as first downs; Alabama also had 59 rushing yards to A&M's 115; and 16 yards receiving to 194. The Crimson Tide prevailed through special teams play and intercepting seven Aggie passes in their victory.

References

1941–42 NCAA football bowl games
1942
1942
1942
January 1942 sports events
Cotton Bowl